Samuel Carter may refer to:

 Samuel P. Carter (1819–1891), United States military officer
 Samuel Carter (Canadian politician) (1859–1944), Ontario manufacturer and political figure
 Samuel Carter (Coventry MP) (1805–1878), Railway solicitor and MP for Coventry
 Samuel Carter (Tavistock MP) (1814–1903), MP for Tavistock
 Samuel John Carter (1835–1892), British artist
 Samuel Casey Carter, American author and researcher
 Samuel J. Carter, creator of Carter's Little Liver Pills
 Samuel Carter (bishop) (1919–2002), Roman Catholic Archbishop of Kingston in Jamaica

See also
Sam Carter (disambiguation)